Sharknose is also the nickname of the Ferrari 156 F1

Sharknose is a term applied by railfans to the styling of several cab unit diesel locomotives built by the Baldwin Locomotive Works to the specifications of the Pennsylvania Railroad.  The styling was by the PRR's preferred designer, Raymond Loewy, with the distinctive nose reminiscent of his design for the PRR T1 steam locomotive.

Pennsylvania Railroad
Locomotives commonly known as "sharknoses" include:
 Baldwin DR-6-4-20, otherwise known as the "Passenger Sharknose" or "Passenger Shark"
 Baldwin DR-4-4-15, otherwise known as the "Freight Sharknose" or "Freight Shark", along with the:
 Baldwin RF-16

Other railroads
While the passenger models were unique to the Pennsylvania Railroad, other railroads purchased and operated the freight models, including the New York Central, Baltimore and Ohio and Elgin, Joliet & Eastern. 
The New York Central was the last original owner to operate the engines, selling the last of them to the Monogahela Railway for $6,000 each in late 1967. By 1972, all but two of them, the 1205 and 1216, had been scrapped. The final pair also were sold for scrap in 1974, but were rescued from the torch by the Delaware and Hudson Railroad, which at the time was also operating the world's last four Alco PA-1 passenger locomotives. The pair were purchased by Castolite Corp. in 1978, which leased them for use on the Michigan Northern. Both engines have purportedly been stored out of public view on the property of the Escanaba and Lake Superior Railroad for more than 20 years.

Automobiles
The name "sharknose" has also been given to streamlined automobiles of the 1930s and 1940s, because of their design, first introduced in 1936 on the 1937 Willys passenger cars. Willys continued to manufacture them in this design until the beginning of World War II. The term was applied to the 1938 Graham-Paige "Spirit of Motion." The design was also used on the 1941 Nash, as well as 1940s Hudson models. The last automobile with this design was the 1947 Hudson.

Many classic BMWs from the 1960s to the 1980s were also designed with a pronounced nose that is commonly referred to as a shark nose.

References

 

Locomotive body styles
Raymond Loewy